Organic reductions or organic oxidations or organic redox reactions are redox reactions that take place with organic compounds. In organic chemistry oxidations and reductions are different from ordinary redox reactions, because many reactions carry the name but do not actually involve electron transfer. Instead the relevant criterion for organic oxidation is gain of oxygen and/or loss of hydrogen, respectively.  

Simple functional groups can be arranged in order of increasing oxidation state. The oxidation numbers are only an approximation:

When methane is oxidized to carbon dioxide its oxidation number changes from −4 to +4. Classical reductions include alkene reduction to alkanes and classical oxidations include oxidation of alcohols to aldehydes. In oxidations electrons are removed and the electron density of a molecule is reduced. In reductions electron density increases when electrons are added to the molecule. This terminology is always centered on the organic compound. For example, it is usual to refer to the reduction of a ketone by lithium aluminium hydride, but not to the oxidation of lithium aluminium hydride by a ketone. Many oxidations involve removal of hydrogen atoms from the organic molecule, and reduction adds hydrogens to an organic molecule.

Many reactions classified as reductions also appear in other classes. For instance, conversion of the ketone to an alcohol by lithium aluminium hydride can be considered a reduction but the hydride is also a good nucleophile in nucleophilic substitution. Many redox reactions in organic chemistry have coupling reaction reaction mechanism involving free radical intermediates. True organic redox chemistry can be found in electrochemical organic synthesis or electrosynthesis. Examples of organic reactions that can take place in an electrochemical cell are the Kolbe electrolysis.

In disproportionation reactions the reactant is both oxidised and reduced in the same chemical reaction forming two separate compounds.

Asymmetric catalytic reductions and asymmetric catalytic oxidations are important in asymmetric synthesis.

Organic oxidations 

Most oxidations are conducted with air or oxygen.  These oxidation include routes to chemical compounds, remediation of pollutants, and combustion.
Several reaction mechanisms exist for organic oxidations:
 Single electron transfer
 Oxidations through ester intermediates with chromic acid or manganese dioxide
 Hydrogen atom transfer as in free radical halogenation
 Oxidation involving ozone in ozonolysis or peroxides (e.g. peroxy acids)
 Oxidations involving an elimination reaction mechanism such as the Swern oxidation, the Kornblum oxidation and with reagents such as IBX acid and Dess-Martin periodinane.
 Oxidation by nitroxide radicals Fremy's salt or TEMPO

Organic reductions 
Several reaction mechanisms exist for organic reductions:
 Direct electron transfers (e.g. Birch reduction).
 Hydride transfer in reductions with for example lithium aluminium hydride or a hydride shift as in the Meerwein-Ponndorf-Verley reduction
 Hydrogenations using a variety of catalysts (e.g. Raney nickel or platinum dioxide) or specific reductions (e.g. named reactions such as Rosenmund reduction).
 Disproportionation reaction such as the Cannizzaro reaction

Reductions that do not fit in any reduction reaction mechanism and in which just the change in oxidation state is reflected include the Wolff-Kishner reaction.

See also
 Oxidizing agent
Reducing agent
Transfer hydrogenation
Electrosynthesis

Functional group oxidations
Oxidation of primary alcohols to aldehydes
Oxidation of primary alcohols to carboxylic acids
Oxidation of secondary alcohols to ketones
Oxidation of oximes and primary amines to nitro compounds
Glycol cleavage
Oxidative cleavage of α-Hydroxy acids
Alkene oxidations
Oxidation of primary amines to nitriles
Oxidation of thiols to sulfonic acids
Oxidation of hydrazines to azo compounds

Functional group reductions
Carbonyl reduction 
Amide reduction
Nitrile reduction
Reduction of nitro compounds
Reduction of imines and Schiff bases
Reduction of aromatic compounds to saturated rings

References

 
Redox